Roberto Penna (born 19 April 1886, date of death unknown) was an Italian athlete.  He competed at the 1908 Summer Olympics in London.

Biography
Penna placed second with a time of 52.4 seconds in his preliminary heat of the 400 metres, not advancing to the semifinals.

Achievements

Notes

References

External links
 

1886 births
Athletes (track and field) at the 1908 Summer Olympics
Olympic athletes of Italy
Italian male sprinters
1910 deaths